Pasiphilodes is a genus of moths in the family Geometridae first described by Warren in 1895.

Species
Pasiphilodes automola
Pasiphilodes chlorocampsis
Pasiphilodes diaboeta
Pasiphilodes diaschista
Pasiphilodes eurystalides
Pasiphilodes fractiscripta
Pasiphilodes hypodela
Pasiphilodes isophrica
Pasiphilodes luteata
Pasiphilodes nina
Pasiphilodes regularis
Pasiphilodes rubrifusa
Pasiphilodes rufogrisea
Pasiphilodes sayata
Pasiphilodes subpalpata
Pasiphilodes subtrita
Pasiphilodes testulata
Pasiphilodes viridescens

References

Eupitheciini
Moth genera